Cinnamon, also known as My Dog's Christmas Miracle, is a 2011 American family movie, released only on video, about a spoiled Maltese puppy and her role in a romantic story involving two single parents and their families.

Plot
When the single parent owner of Cinnamon, a Maltese puppy, falls for a single parent architect, the dog tries to break up the relationship, succeeds, realizes the unhappiness that results, and then tries to reunite the couple.

Cast
 Cynthia Gibb as Professor Madeline Walters
 Greg Evigan as Kevin Fallon
 Ashley Leggat as Chloe Walters
 Ciara Bravo as Heather
 Brenda Song as Cinnamon (voice)
 Lesley-Anne Down as Dora
 Robert Carradine as Professor Jerry Meinhardt
 Kendall Ryan Sanders as Jordan Fallon
 Charlie Stewart as Sam
 Joey Diaz as TSA Agent

References

External links
 
 

2011 comedy films
2011 films
Films about dogs
American comedy films
2010s English-language films
Films directed by Michael Feifer
2010s American films